Euromoia is a genus of moths of the family Noctuidae, first described by Otto Staudinger in 1892.

References

Natural History Museum Lepidoptera genus database

Hadeninae